Johannes Meisenheimer (30 June 1873 Griesheim - 24 February 1933 Leipzig) was a German zoologist.

He was a professor at the University of Leipzig.

Bibliography 
 Meisenheimer J. (1906). Die Pteropoden der deutschen Sud-polar Expedition 1901-1903. In: Deutsche Sudpolar-Expedition 1901–1903. 9 (Zool.), 1(2): 92-152, pl. 5–7.
 (1908). Entwicklungsgeschichte der Tiere. Leipzig.
 (1912). Die Weinbergschnecke Helix pomatia L. Leipzig.
 (1921–1930). Geschlecht und Geschlechter. Jena.
 (1923). Die Vererbungslehre in gemeinverständlicher Darstellung ihres Inhalts. Jena.

References

External links 
 Johannes Meisenheimer in the catalog of German National Library

20th-century German zoologists
1873 births
1933 deaths